The Siboga expedition was a Dutch zoological and hydrographic expedition to Indonesia from March 1899 to February 1900.

The leader of the expedition was Max Carl Wilhelm Weber. Other members of the crew were his wife Anna Weber-van Bosse, the zoologist and first assistant Jan Versluys, the zoologist and second assistant Hugo Frederik Nierstrasz, the physician A. Schmidt, and the artist J. W. Huysmans. Captain Gustaaf Frederik Tydeman was responsible for making hydrographic measurements.

Gallery

See also 
Rudolph Bergh
Ethel Sarel Gepp
Paul Mayer (zoologist)
Mattheus Marinus Schepman
Anna Weber-van Bosse

References

Further reading 
 (November 1900) "The Dutch "Siboga" Expedition to the Malay Archipelago". The Geographical Journal 16(5): 549–552. JSTOR
 (November 1904) "Review: Research in the Malay Archipelago. Reviewed work(s): Siboga-Expeditie. Uitkomsten op zoologisch, botanisch, oceanographisch en geologisch Gebied verzameld in Nederlandsch Oost-Indië 1899-1900 aan boord H. M. S. Siboga". The Geographical Journal 24(5): 578–580. JSTOR
(1904) The Corallinaceae of the Siboga - expedition. Anna Weber-Van Bosse.

External links 

 science.uva.nl archive
 works related to Siboga Expedition at Internet Archive

1899 in science
1900 in science
Asian expeditions
Exploration of Indonesia
Oceanographic expeditions
Expeditions from the Netherlands